Pedro Filipe Ventura Ribeiro (born 1 July 1995) is a Portuguese footballer who plays for Atlético as a midfielder.

Football career
On 27 July 2014, Ribeiro made his professional debut with Atlético in a 2014–15 Taça da Liga match against Aves.

References

External links

Stats and profile at LPFP 

1995 births
Living people
Portuguese footballers
Association football midfielders
Liga Portugal 2 players
Footballers from Lisbon
Atlético Clube de Portugal players